Leandro Chaves Rodrigues (born 4 October 1983), better known as Leandro Chaves, is a Brazilian footballer who plays for Potiguar.

Career
Chaves was born in Duque de Caxias and played football for America Football Club, appearing for the club in the 2007 Copa do Brasil. In the summer of 2013 Chaves signed with Iran Pro League club Foolad. In his first and only season with Foolad, Chaves helped the club win the Iran Pro League title for the second time in the club's history.

External links
Profile at Globo Esporte's Futpedia
Profile at TFF

Leandro Chaves at ZeroZero

1983 births
Living people
Brazilian footballers
Expatriate footballers in Iran
Brazilian expatriates in Iran
Association football forwards
MKE Ankaragücü footballers
Esporte Clube Tigres do Brasil players
Duque de Caxias Futebol Clube players
Ipatinga Futebol Clube players
Boavista Sport Club players
Figueirense FC players
Ceará Sporting Club players
Foolad FC players
America Football Club (RJ) players
Brasiliense Futebol Clube players
Madureira Esporte Clube players
Nacional Futebol Clube players
Bangu Atlético Clube players
Audax Rio de Janeiro Esporte Clube players
People from Duque de Caxias, Rio de Janeiro
Sportspeople from Rio de Janeiro (state)